The Copperbelt is a natural region in Central Africa which sits on the border region between northern Zambia and the southern Democratic Republic of Congo. It is known for copper mining.

Traditionally, the term Copperbelt includes the mining regions of Zambia's Copperbelt Province (notably the towns of Ndola, Kitwe, Chingola, Luanshya, and Mufulira in particular) and the Congo's Haut-Katanga and Lualaba provinces (notably Lubumbashi, Kolwezi, and Likasi). In some contexts the term may exclude the Congo entirely. Zambia's Copperbelt became a province soon after independence in 1964, when it was named "Western province". President Kenneth Kaunda changed the name to its present-day "Copperbelt province" in 1969. From the time of the Bantu expansion, both the Congo's Katanga and Zambia's Copperbelt regions have been called "Ilamba" or "Lambaland", after the Lamba people. Both provinces are rich in mineral wealth.

Prehistory 
The Copperbelt was not inhabited before the arrival of the Lamba people from the Luba and Lunda kingdoms. The Lamba settled at Lake Kashiba, and from there the Lamba kingdom spread eastward, northward, southward and westward.

History 

The Western discovery of copper in Zambia is partly due to American scout Frederick Russell Burnham. In 1895 he led the Northern Territories (BSA) Exploration Co. expedition, which determined that major copper deposits existed in Central Africa.  Along the Kafue River in then-Northern Rhodesia, Burnham saw many similarities to copper deposits he had worked in the United States, and he encountered natives wearing copper bracelets.  In his report to the British South Africa Company Burnham said about the region:

About 200 miles north of the Falls on the Incalla river, and twelve miles from the Kafukwe [now known as the Kafue River] and still on the high plateau is probably one of the greatest copper fields on the continent. The natives have worked this ore for ages, as can be seen by their old dumps, and they work it to-day. The field is very extensive, and reaches away to Katanga... The natives inhabiting this part of the country are skilled workmen, and have traded their handiwork with all comers, even as far afield as the Portuguese of the West Coast and the Arabs of the East. These natives, being miners and workers of copper and iron, and being permanently located in the ground, would give the very element needed in developing these fields.

The increasing use of copper bids fair to make it one of the most valuable products a country can have.... The copper mines of Montana and Arizona have proven of more value than the gold mines, regardless of the fact that the copper had to be hauled two thousand miles by rail to the seaboard, and the coal and coke to smelt it hauled hundreds of miles to the mines. So far as natural difficulties are concerned, this northern field can be fed from the coal deposits of the valley of the Zambezi [Burnham had previously discovered massive coal fields at Hwange], and the product shipped to the East Coast at a less expense than the product of Montana and Arizona can be laid on the dock at New York.

Many years later, the British South Africa Company built towns along the river and a railroad to transport the copper through Mozambique.

Geology
During the 1950s, the Copperbelt was the largest copper-producing area in the world, including the Roan Antelope Mine, Nkana Mine, Nchanga Mines, Mufulira Mine, and Rokana Mine.  Chalcopyrite, bornite, and chalcocite are found in the metamorphosed calcareous shales and arkoses of the Lower Roan Formation in the Katanga System.

See also 

Kolwezi Mine
Dikuluwe Mine
Konkola Copper Mines
Luanshya
Lumwana mine
Sentinel mine
Kansanshi mine
Copperbelt Province
Chambishi
Anvil Mining
Domeyko Fault
Glencore
Camrose Resources Limited
Union Minière du Haut Katanga (UMHK)
Xstrata
Sir Robert Williams, 1st Baronet, of Park

References

External links 

Descriptive Models, Grade-Tonnage Relations, and Databases for the Assessment of Sediment-Hosted Copper Deposits, with Emphasis on Deposits in the Central African Copperbelt, Democratic Republic of the Congo and Zambia

Belt regions
Copper mining in the Democratic Republic of the Congo
Copper mines in Zambia
Copperbelt Province
Haut-Katanga Province
Lualaba Province
Geology of Africa
Central Zambezian miombo woodlands